Herm is one of the Channel Islands in the English Channel.

Herm  or L'Herm may also refer to:

Places
Herm, Landes, a French commune
L'Herm, a French commune

People
Herm (given name), a list of people with the given name or nickname
Gerhard Herm (born 1931), German journalist and writer
Klaus Herm (born 1925), German actor

Other uses
Château de l'Herm, a French castle
Herm (sculpture) a four-cornered pillar surmounted by a bust or head
herm., a botanical/zoological abbreviation for a hermaphrodite, an organism with both sexes 
Herm., following the name of a Christian saint, it denotes that the saint was a hermit
Herm, a fictional race of aliens in Marvel Comics, among them Klaatu

See also
Herms, a surname or given name